Sincan may refer to:
Sincan, Azerbaijan
 Sincan, Ankara, Turkey
 Sincan, Alaca